Alan C. Martin (born 4 August 1966) is a British comics writer best known as author of the comic strip Tank Girl.

Hewlett and Martin 

Martin first met Tank Girl co-creator Jamie Hewlett in 1986 when they were studying at the West Sussex College of Design in Worthing. With fellow student Philip Bond they began collaborating on a comic/fanzine called Atomtan.

The Tank Girl series first appeared in the debut issue of Deadline (1988), a UK magazine intended as a forum for new comic talent, or as its publishers Brett Ewins and Tom Astor put it, "a forum for the wild, wacky and hitherto unpublishable," and it continued until the end of the magazine in 1995.

Tank Girl film

In 1995, the comic was also adapted into a critically and financially unsuccessful film. The film featured Lori Petty as Tank Girl and Naomi Watts as Jet Girl. 

Martin and Hewlett spoke poorly of the experience, with Martin calling it "a bit of a sore point" for them. After Deadline folded, Martin and Hewlett attempted to create another strip together called The 16s, which he described as a across between Tank Girl and Peanuts. The strip was not published, and marked the end of their partnership.

Since 1995

After the film, Martin wandered around for a bit, staying at communes with hippie friends, looking for stone circles and ancient sites before settling in Berwick-upon-Tweed in Northumberland with his wife Lou and two children Wynne and Rufus Bodie (named after Lewis Collins' character in The Professionals). Martin has played in various bands, written a Tank Girl novel (Armadillo) published in March 2008 by Titan Books, as well as various screenplays and scripts. He wrote the first new Tank Girl limited series in over ten years: Tank Girl: The Gifting with award-winning Australian artist Ashley Wood. Published by American publishers IDW, the first issue was released in June 2007.

We went to the comics graveyard and dug her up. She's smelling pretty bad, but we're gonna put her in a wheelbarrow and parade her around for all to see, anyway.

Since 2007, Martin has dedicated his time exclusively to the Tank Girl franchise, writing over a dozen graphic novels, and designing several art books. In 2014, Martin, along with original artist Hewlett, and old school friend Bond, launched 21st century Tank Girl as a Kickstarter, which was funded in less than 48 hours, the ensuing comic series went on to become the best selling Tank Girl series ever. This was followed by the mini-series Two Girls One Tank which also proved to be enormously successful. Since 2015, Martin has worked on Tank Girl projects exclusively with self-trained American artist Brett Parson.

Notes

References

External links
Official Tank Girl website
Tumblr account

Interviews
Suicide Girls Interview - With Alan Martin about the Tank Girl relaunch
Alan Martin interview - about the 2007 relaunch from IDW comics.

Living people
British comics writers
1966 births